Corrupt is a 1999 film starring Ice-T and Silkk the Shocker.

Plot
After decades of street violence, two gangs have finally made a truce. MJ (Silkk The Shocker) has finally found a way to get out of the deadly neighborhood him and his sister Jodi are living in. Corrupt (Ice-T) the only person standing in MJ's way of leaving. This will result in a war between two gangs.

Cast
 Ice-T as Corrupt
 Silkk the Shocker as M.J.
 Miss Jones as Margo
 Ernie Hudson Jr. as Miles
 Karen Dyer as Jodi
 T. J. Storm as Cinque
 Tahitia Hicks as Lisa (as Tahitia)
 Taylor Scott as Pammi
 Jahi J.J. Zuri as Yazu
 Romany Malco as Snackbar Man

Production
Director Pyun shot Corrupt simultaneously with The Wrecking Crew and Urban Menace in a derelict factory in Eastern Europe, originally intending Urban Menace and The Wrecking Crew as sections of a single film; the producers decided to make two films.

Reaction 
Corrupt was received poorly. Ice-T bashed the film on the commentary.  It received low ratings. It received two rotten reviews on Rotten Tomatoes.

References

External links 
 

1999 films
1999 drama films
American gang films
Hood films
American drama films
1990s English-language films
1990s American films